Darnell Marquies Wright (born August 10, 2001) is an American football offensive tackle for the Tennessee Volunteers.

High school career 
Wright attended Huntington High School in Huntington, West Virginia. He was named to the roster for the 2019 Under Armour All-America Game. A five-star recruit, he committed to play college football at the University of Tennessee.

College career 
As a freshman in 2019, Wright played in 11 games and recorded seven starts. He was named to the 2019 SEC All-Freshman Team as a result. Wright would then make nine starts in 2020, and 13 in 2021. Entering the 2022 season, Wright was projected as a first round draft pick in the upcoming 2023 NFL Draft.

References

External links 
 
 Tennessee Volunteers bio

2001 births
Living people
American football offensive tackles
Huntington High School (West Virginia) alumni
Players of American football from West Virginia
Sportspeople from Huntington, West Virginia
Tennessee Volunteers football players